Maritza Lizeth Gallego Félix is a Mexican journalist, producer and writer on Telemundo Arizona.

Career 

Maritza was born in Magdalena de Kino, Sonora on October 23, 1982. She graduated with honors from Universidad del Noroeste, in Hermosillo, Sonora, in June 2004. She majored in communications. She has continuing with her education at Tecnológico de Monterrey, the Poynter Institute, and other prestigious institutions in Mexico and USA.

Journalistic trajectory 

Maritza Felix began her journalistic career since she enrolled at the university. She completed her internship at Radio Sonora and Televisa Sonora, then became the programming director and on air talent at XEDJ in her hometown Magdalena de Kino.

In 2004, she joined Periodicos Healy, working for El Imparcial and La i. In 2006 she moved to the United States and from Los Angeles, California, she began writing the first chapters of a book that is still in process.

In 2009, Félix moved to Phoenix, Arizona, and joined the team of collaborators of Prensa Hispana, the largest Spanish-language publication in Spanish in Arizona and one of the most renowned publications in the United States.

In 2014, she joined the Telemundo Arizona team as a journalist, writer and producer. In 2016, she won her first two Emmy awards, making "Enfoque Arizona" an award-winning political and community show.

She has been a collaborator for important national and international media such as Javier Solórzano's news program on Radio Fórmula, in Mexico; NTN24 Colombia; Radio Qué Pasa, in North Carolina, the public television station in Finland, Puente Project, Telemax, Uniradio, Grupo Larsa,  Organización Editorial Mexicana.
In addition, she did an investigative report for a documentary at Discovery Channel Latin America called "Mysteries of the Faith". She is the international representative of the Spanish organization Oceanidas  in the United States and North America.

In her career, she has had collaborations with Univision (television and radio), Azteca América, TV Azteca, Onda 1190 AM, Latino Vibe 95.1FM, among other media. Now she is a journalist, producer and writer on Telemundo Arizona.

Awards and distinctions 

She was named as one of the 40 Hispanic leaders under the age of 40 in Arizona, by the organizations Valle del Sol and Chicanos por la Causa.

She has won multiple awards from the Arizona Press Club and has swept the state's Spanish-language news contests. In the years of 2012 and 2013, she was named the "Best Spanish-Speaking Journalist in Phoenix" by the Phoenix New Times magazine, one of the most important recognition's among the journalism guild of Arizona; the publication describes her work as "one so good that everyone should learn Spanish to read it".

In 2016, just one year after joining Telemundo Arizona, she won her first two Emmys. In 2017 she received three Emmy nominations more.

References

1982 births
Living people
Mexican women journalists
People from Magdalena de Kino